The council area is divided into civil parishes: 
 Alloa (partly in Perthshire until 1891)
 Alva (in Stirlingshire until 1891)
 Clackmannan
 Dollar
 Muckhart (originally in Perthshire; now split between Clackmannanshire and Perth and Kinross)
 Tillicoultry

A List of churches in Clackmannanshire, Scotland:

Clackmannan Parish Church, Clackmannan
Dollar Parish Church, Dollar
Hillfoots Evangelical Church, Tillcoultry
Muckhart Parish Church, Muckhart
St James the Great Church, Dollar
St. Mungo's Parish Church, Alloa
Tullibody Old Kirk, Tullibody

External links

 Churches in Clackmannanshire
Clackmannanshire